The 2018–19 UConn Huskies women's basketball team represented the University of Connecticut (UConn) during the 2018–19 NCAA Division I women's basketball season. The Huskies, led by Hall of Fame head coach Geno Auriemma in his 34th season at UConn, played their home games at Harry A. Gampel Pavilion and the XL Center and were sixth year members of the American Athletic Conference. They finished the season 35–3, 16–0 in AAC play to win the AAC regular season championship. They defeated East Carolina, South Florida, and UCF to win the AAC women's tournament title. As a result, they received the conference's automatic bid to the NCAA women's tournament. As the No. 2 seed, they defeated Towson and Buffalo to advance to the Sweet Sixteen. They defeated UCLA in the Sweet Sixteen and Louisville in the Elite Eight to reach their 20th Final Four. In the National Semifinal, they lost in the rematch of last year's national semifinal game to Notre Dame.

Media
Every Connecticut women's game was televised. Excluding exhibitions, most Connecticut games aired on SNY, an ESPN network, or a CBS network. Exhibition games and games that aired on SNY were also streamed on Husky Vision. Every game was broadcast on the UConn IMG Sports Network with an extra audio broadcast available online to listen to through Husky Vision.

Off-season

Departures

Recruits

Roster

Alexis Gordon was only on the roster for the fall semester, after which she transferred from UConn.

Games

Exhibition

Vanguard 
The Huskies opened their exhibition schedule against Vanguard, a team they played as an exhibition in the 2015–16 season. Freshman Christyn Williams scored the first four points for Connecticut and had 10 points by halftime. Seniors Katie Lou Samuelson and Napheesa Collier scored 26 points each. After a dominating first half, coach Auriemma gave more playing time to the bench, who were outscored 15–0 in the fourth quarter. The final score was 96–30.

Southern Connecticut State 
After scoring 26 points in the opening exhibition game against Vanguard, Katie Lou Samuelson repeated that feat in the second exhibition game against Southern Connecticut. All 11 Huskies played in the game. Christyn Williams and Crystal Dangerfield were also double-digit scorers with 18 and 10 points respectively. The Huskies won the game 99–45.

Regular season

Ohio State 
UConn opened the regular season with a game against Ohio State. Four Huskies recorded double digit scoring, led by Samuelson with 19, Dangerfield with 18, Collier with 17, and Walker with 15. Connecticut scored off the opening tip and never trailed, winning the game 85–53.

Schedule

|-
!colspan=12 style=""| Exhibition

|-
!colspan=12 style=""| Regular season

|-
!colspan=12 style=""|AAC Women's tournament

|-
!colspan=12 style=""|NCAA Women's tournament

Rankings

^ Coaches did not release a Week 2 poll.

Player statistics

See also
 2018–19 UConn Huskies men's basketball team

References

UConn Huskies women's basketball seasons
Connecticut
Connect
Connect
Connecticut
NCAA Division I women's basketball tournament Final Four seasons